M-218 was a state trunkline highway in the US state of Michigan that served as a connector route from Interstate 96 (I-96, originally US Highway 16, US 16) in Wixom through Oakland County's lake country area to Business US 10 (Bus. US 10) in Pontiac. M-218 was originally designated by 1936 and extended into Pontiac in 1938. The highway was decommissioned in 1963.

Route description
M-218 began at a junction with I-96 in Wixom. From there, the road traveled north via Wixom Road to present-day Pontiac Trail (which at the time was 14 Mile Road) and continued northeast. The trunkline then continued along Pontiac Trail, meandering through the communities of Walled Lake, Orchard Lake Village, Keego Harbor and Sylvan Lake in Oakland County's lake country. Northeast of Sylvan lake, the highway crossed US 10 (Telegraph Road) and crossed into Pontiac. M-218 terminated at a junction with Bus. US 10 in downtown.

History
When M-218 was first introduced into the State Trunkline System by 1936, it served as a connector between M-58 in Pontiac and US 16 in West Novi. In 1938, the route was extended into Pontiac where it terminated at US 10. The trunkline continued to serve in this capacity until it was removed from the trunkline system in 1963.

Major intersections

See also

References

External links

M-218 at Michigan Highways

218
Transportation in Oakland County, Michigan